Ryswyck Point is a point marking the east extremity of Anvers Island, in the Palmer Archipelago. It was discovered and named by the Belgian Antarctic Expedition, 1897–99, under de Gerlache.

See also
Gerlache Strait Geology
Anvers Island Geology

Headlands of the Palmer Archipelago